Palomine is the debut studio album by Dutch indie rock band Bettie Serveert. It was released in October 1992 by Brinkman Records. The album was issued in the United Kingdom by the 4AD subsidiary label Guernica on 2 November 1992, and in the United States by Matador Records in 1993.

Track listing

Notes
 "Brain-Tag" is omitted from the LP edition of the album. The UK LP edition, released by Guernica, instead included a bonus 7" disc featuring "Brain-Tag" on side one and "Get the Bird" and "Smile" on side two.

Personnel
Credits are adapted from the album's liner notes.

Bettie Serveert
 Herman Bunskoeke – bass
 Carol van Dijk – guitar, vocals
 Berend Dubbe – drums
 Peter Visser – guitar

Production
 Bettie Serveert – production
 Berend Dubbe – mixing
 Frans Hagenaars – production, mixing
 Edwin "Hank" Heath – production, mixing
 The Masters – mastering

Design
 Diederik van der Donk – photography
 Roel Siebrand – cover design

Charts

References

External links
 

1992 debut albums
Bettie Serveert albums
4AD albums
Matador Records albums